North or  also known by other names, is a lake northeast of Golmud in Dulan County, Haixi Prefecture, Qinghai Province, China. A part of the Qarhan Playa, it is filled from the east by the Qaidam River. Like the other lakes of the surrounding Qaidam Basin, it is extremely saline.

Name
Hulsan or Hollusun Nor is a romanization of the Mongolian name meaning "Reed Lake", from their former abundance in the area. The adjective "north" distinguishes it from nearby South Hulsan Lake. Huoluxun and Huobuxun are the pinyin romanizations of the Mandarin pronunciation of the same name's transcriptions into Chinese characters. Bei Hulsan or Beihuobuxun is the same name, prefixed with the Chinese word for "North".

Geography
It lies east of Xiezuo Lake and north of South Hulsan Lake. North Hulsan Lake is chiefly fed from the east by the Qaidam River   Cháidámù Hé). An inflow from the north by mineral springs in the playa's northern karst zone contribute a smaller volume of water but its much higher solute concentration greatly affects the lake and its sediments. North Hulsan Lake's sediments have a relatively higher potassium content than most other lakes in the playa.

History

North Hulsan Lake has been greatly affected by the rapid expansion of the industrial processing of Qarhan's salt lakes for potassium and other valuable minerals since 2000. Fang & al. found it had lost 8.1Gt (8.9 billion short tons) of water between 1995 and 2015, and Zhou & al. reported that the lake proper could not be distinguished at all from the surrounding salt pans in satellite imagery as of 2014.

See also
 Qarhan Playa and Qaidam Basin
 List of lakes and saltwater lakes of China

Notes

References

Citations

Bibliography
 .
 .
 .
 .
 .
 .
 .
 .
 .
 .
 .

Lakes of China
Lakes of Qinghai
Haixi Mongol and Tibetan Autonomous Prefecture